Timothy Macgill Melville (born October 9, 1989) is an American professional baseball pitcher for the Wei Chuan Dragons of the Chinese Professional Baseball League (CPBL). He has played in Major League Baseball (MLB) for the Cincinnati Reds, Minnesota Twins, San Diego Padres, and Colorado Rockies. Melville also played in the Chinese Professional Baseball League (CPBL) for the Uni-President Lions.

Career
Melville attended Wentzville Holt High School in Wentzville, Missouri. He played for the school's baseball team as a pitcher. In 2007, his junior year, he threw a perfect game. He pitched to a 10–1 win–loss record and a 0.89 earned run average (ERA) as a junior, and was named the Aflac National Player of the Year. He pitched to an 8–1 win–loss record and a 2.56 ERA in his senior year, while recording 89 strikeouts in 57 innings pitched. He committed to attend the University of North Carolina at Chapel Hill (UNC) to play for the North Carolina Tar Heels on a college baseball scholarship.

Kansas City Royals
Baseball America ranked Melville as the best high school player available in the 2008 Major League Baseball draft. Because of the commitment to UNC, Melville fell out of the first round in the draft. The Kansas City Royals selected him in the fourth round, with the 115th overall selection, and signed him to a contract with a $1.25 million signing bonus.

Melville began his professional career with the Burlington Bees of the Class A Midwest League in 2009, pitching to a 7–7 win–loss record and a 3.79 ERA. He was promoted to the Wilmington Blue Rocks of the Class A-Advanced Carolina League in 2010, where he struggled, pitching to a 2–12 win–loss record and a 4.97 ERA. He returned to Wilmington in 2011, and compiled an 11–10 record with a 4.32 ERA. Melville required Tommy John surgery in 2012. In 2014, Melville pitched for the Northwest Arkansas Naturals of the Class AA Texas League, but struggled with a 2–11 win–loss record, a 5.50 ERA, while allowing 68 walks in  innings.

Detroit Tigers
After the 2014 season, when he became a free agent. He signed with the Detroit Tigers for the 2015 season, and played for the Toledo Mud Hens of the Class AAA International League.

Cincinnati Reds
He signed with the Cincinnati Reds for the 2016 season. The Reds considered adding Melville to their Opening Day starting rotation, but instead chose Robert Stephenson, who was already on the Reds' 40-man roster. Melville was assigned to the Louisville Bats of the International League.

On April 8, the Reds announced Melville would start in the series finale against the Pittsburgh Pirates, in place of Anthony DeSclafani, on April 10. The start marked Melville's MLB debut. He threw 4 innings giving up 1 run in a no-decision vs. Pittsburgh. The Reds designated Melville for assignment on April 22.

Long Island Ducks
On April 6, 2017, Melville signed with the Long Island Ducks of the Atlantic League of Professional Baseball.

Minnesota Twins
On June 12, 2017, the Minnesota Twins signed him to a minor league contract, assigning him to the Rochester Red Wings (AAA). After allowing 5 runs (4 earned) to the Chicago White Sox, Melville was designated for assignment by the Twins to make room for John Curtiss on the roster.

San Diego Padres
Melville was claimed off waivers by the San Diego Padres on August 26, 2017.

Baltimore Orioles
He elected free agency on November 6, 2017, and signed a minor league contract with the Baltimore Orioles on December 22. He elected free agency on November 3, 2018.

Return to Long Island
On February 5, 2019, Melville signed with the Long Island Ducks of the Atlantic League of Professional Baseball.

Colorado Rockies
On May 3, 2019, Melville's contract was purchased by the Colorado Rockies, and he was assigned to the Triple-A Albuquerque Isotopes. On August 21, the Rockies selected Melville's contract and promoted him to the major leagues as an emergency starter.  In his Rockies debut against the Arizona Diamondbacks, Melville pitched 7 innings and allowed only 1 run on 2 hits as the Rockies won 7-2, giving Melville his first major league win.  5 days later, Melville made his debut at Coors Field and had another impressive performance against the Atlanta Braves, pitching 5 shutout innings and striking out 6 as the Rockies went on to defeat the Braves 3-1. Melville's ERA of 0.75 is the 3rd lowest ERA posted by a Rockies pitcher through his first two starts with the club. On October 30, 2019, Melville was outrighted off the Rockies roster. Melville re-signed with the Rockies on a minor league deal on February 5, 2020. He was released by the Rockies organization on May 18, 2020.

Uni-President Lions
On July 12, 2020, Melville signed with the Uni-President Lions of the Chinese Professional Baseball League. He re-signed with the team for the 2021 season. On April 2, 2021, Melville pitched a no-hitter against Wei Chuan Dragons becoming the 10th player to do so in Chinese Professional Baseball League history. He also set the record of most pitches thrown in a no-hitter in the league, with 142 pitches. For the season, Melville posted a 8–7 record with a 3.74 ERA and 84 strikeouts over 122.2 innings. He was not re-signed for the 2022 season and became a free agent.

Wei Chuan Dragons
Melville took the 2022 season off as he dealt with elbow inflammation. He received platelet-rich plasma treatment for the injury. On February 8, 2023, Melville signed with the Wei Chuan Dragons of the Chinese Professional Baseball League.

Personal life
When Melville was 11 years old, he had surgery to correct his pectus excavatum at the Children's Hospital of The King's Daughters in Norfolk, Virginia. A steel rod was implanted in his chest, and removed one and a half years later.

References

External links

1989 births
Living people
Sportspeople from Alexandria, Virginia
People from Wentzville, Missouri
Baseball players from Virginia
Baseball players from Missouri
Major League Baseball pitchers
Cincinnati Reds players
Minnesota Twins players
San Diego Padres players
Colorado Rockies players
Burlington Bees players
Wilmington Blue Rocks players
Arizona League Royals players
Northwest Arkansas Naturals players
Kane County Cougars players
Idaho Falls Chukars players
Toledo Mud Hens players
Louisville Bats players
Arizona League Reds players
Naranjeros de Hermosillo players
American expatriate baseball players in Mexico
Long Island Ducks players
Rochester Red Wings players
El Paso Chihuahuas players
Norfolk Tides players
Albuquerque Isotopes players